HMS Hercules was a central-battery ironclad of the Royal Navy in the Victorian era, and was the first warship to mount a main armament of  calibre guns.

Design

She was designed by Sir Edward Reed, and was in all significant factors an enlarged version of his earlier creation  with thicker armour and heavier guns. She had a pointed ram where previous ships had sported a rounded one; she was built with a forecastle, but had no poop until fitted with one as preparation for her role as  Flagship, Mediterranean Fleet. She carried a balanced rudder, which reduced the physical effort of turning the wheel. Steam-powered steering was installed in 1874.

The arrangement of the guns precluded the usual arrangement where the anchor cable led into the main deck; in Hercules these cables led into the upper deck; she was the first battleship to be so fitted.

Armament
She was the first warship to carry the new  muzzle-loading rifle, which were ranged four on either side in a box battery. The foremost and aftermost guns could be traversed to fire to within a few degrees of the line of the keel through recessed embrasures in the battery walls. A well-trained crew could fire one shot every 70 seconds.

A  gun was placed on the mid-line on the main at stem and stern to provide end-on fire, and the  guns were mounted either side fore and aft on the upper deck, with firing embrasures cut to allow either end-on or broadside fire.

She carried two torpedo carriages for  Whitehead torpedoes on the main deck from 1878.

Service history
She was commissioned at Chatham, and served in the Channel Fleet until 1874.

In 1870 five of her 10-inch guns were damaged when shells burst before leaving the guns' barrels. In 1872 it was reported that three of the 10 inch guns were damaged.

Northumberland was seriously damaged below the waterline, with one compartment flooded, though she was able to steam to Malta for repairs. Hercules, on the other hand sustained damage to bottom and sides. After a refit from 1874 to 1875 she was posted as Flagship, Mediterranean Fleet, until 1877. Paid off at Portsmouth, she was re-commissioned as Flagship of the Particular Service Squadron formed under the command of Admiral Astley Cooper Key at the time of the Russian war scare in 1878. She was then relegated to the post of guardship in the Clyde until 1881. 

She was flagship of the reserve fleet from 1881 until 1890, with a short break in 1885 when she formed part of the second Particular Service Squadron formed under Admiral Geoffrey Hornby.

Modernised between 1892 and 1893, she was held in reserve at Portsmouth until 1904. From March to June 1902 she served temporarily as port guard ship at Portland with the crew of the permanent guardship HMS Revenge, which was in for a refit. In July the same year she was temporarily commissioned by Captain John de Robeck, who transferred to HMS Warrior when it had finished a refit to become depot ship. Her name changed to Calcutta in 1904, she served as depot ship at Gibraltar until 1914; she was then towed home, her engines being by this time inoperable, and became an artificers' training establishment at Portsmouth under the name of Fisgard II. By this time she was lacking masts, funnels, armament and superstructure, and was quite unrecognisable as the ship which had been widely regarded as Reed's masterpiece.

Gunnery trials 
A trial was undertaken in 1870 to compare the accuracy and rate of fire of turret-mounted heavy guns with those in a centre-battery ship. Each ship fired for five minutes, with the guns starting "loaded and very carefully trained". Three out of the Captain's four hits were achieved with the first salvo; firing this salvo caused the ship to roll heavily (±20°); smoke from firing made aiming difficult. The Monarch and the Hercules also did better with their first salvo, were inconvenienced by the smoke of firing, and to a lesser extent were caused to roll by firing. On the Hercules the gunsights were on the guns, and this worked better than the turret roof gunsights used by the other ships.

References

Bibliography
 

 Parkes, Oscar, British Battleships

External links

 

Battleships of the Royal Navy
Ships built in Chatham
1868 ships
Victorian-era battleships of the United Kingdom
Maritime incidents in December 1872